The 1928 Vanderbilt Commodores football team represented Vanderbilt University in the 1928 college football season. The 1928 season was Dan McGugin's 24th year as head coach.

Schedule

Coaching staff
 Dan McGugin (Michigan '03), head coach
 Johnny "Red" Floyd (Vanderbilt '20), assistant coach
 Lewie Hardage (Vanderbilt '12), backfield coach
 Hek Wakefield (Vanderbilt '24), end coach
 Gus Morrow (Vanderbilt '22), line coach

References

Vanderbilt
Vanderbilt Commodores football seasons
Vanderbilt Commodores football